Sambo was contested at the 2013 Summer Universiade from July 14 to 16 at the Tatneft Arena in Kazan, Russia. Sambo made its debut at the 2013 Summer Universiade.

Medal summary

Medal table

Men's events

Women's events

References

External links
 
 2013 Summer Universiade – Sambo
 Results book

2013
2013 Summer Universiade events
2013 in sambo (martial art)